Camilla Brinck is a Swedish singer. She released her first album in the early 2000s. She is mostly known for her two singles "Bye Bye Forever (Chiki Chiki)" and "Tell me". She participated in the semi-finals of Melodifestivalen 2005 with the song "Jenny", but failed to qualify for the final.
In 2006 Camilla Brinck joined the Swedish popband "Nouveau Riche". The debut album "Pink Trash" was released in 2007.

External links
Official site

Swedish women singers
Living people
Year of birth missing (living people)
Melodifestivalen contestants of 2005